Ettelbruck railway station is a railway station serving Ettelbruck, in central Luxembourg.  It is operated by Chemins de Fer Luxembourgeois, the state-owned railway company.

The station is situated on Line 10, which connects Luxembourg City to the centre and north of the country.  Ettelbruck is a junction, with the main line heading further northwards, towards Gouvy and Wiltz, and a branch line connecting to Diekirch.

External links
 Official CFL page on Ettelbruck station
 Rail.lu page on Ettelbruck station

Railway station
Railway stations in Luxembourg
Railway stations on CFL Line 10